In chess, a clearance sacrifice is a tactical motif which involves a square on the chessboard being vacated to open up lines of attack. The tactic may also result in the substitution of a piece hindering the attack by a piece useful to the attack.

Example

In the diagram, the clearance sacrifice 1.Rf8+ vacates the f7 square and, after 1...Rxf8 (better than 1...Bxf8 2.Qg8#), White utilizes the battery on the a2–g8 diagonal. After 2.Qg8+ Rxg8 (only move), White has a classic smothered mate with 3.Nf7#, utilizing the f7 square vacated by the clearance sacrifice.

References 

Chess tactics